{{infobox book
| name         = Shah Jo Risalo
| title_orig   = '
شاه جو رسالو| translator   =
| image        = Shah Jo Risalo.jpg
| caption= 
| author       = Shah Abdul Latif Bhittai
| illustrator  =
| cover_artist =
| country      = Pakistan
| language     = Sindhi
| series       =
| subject      =SufismCultureHistory
| genre        = Poetry
| publisher    =Sindhi Adabi Board
| pub_date     =
| pages        =
| isbn         =
}}Shah Jo Risalo is a poetic compendium of famous Sindhi Sufi poet Shah Abdul Latif Bhittai. In fact, it is many compendia, for Shah Abdul Latif's poetry in various forms of bayt and wai was compiled by many of his devotees during his lifetime and after his death. The devotees compiled his poetry and designated it as Shah Jo Risalo or Poetry of Shah.

Ernest Trumpp called it Diwan when he edited the Risalo and published it from Leipzig, Germany in 1866 A.D. Afterwards, many scholars and linguists have published the Shah Jo Risalo with their own compilations, hence many editions are available.

Shah Jo Risalo, written in very pure and concise Sindhi verses, is great storehouse for Muslims but also for the Hindus. Shah Abdul Latif has hidden his mystical ideas under layers of symbols taken from all spheres of life as well as from the classical Sufi tradition, and particularly from Maulana Rumi's Mathnawi.

 Surs (chapters) 
The traditional compilations of Shah Jo Risalo include 30 Surs (chapters) which were compiled by renowned researchers. The oldest publications of Shah Jo Risalo contained some 36 Surs, but later most of the linguists discarded 6 Surs, as their language and content did not match the Shah's style. Recently, Dr. Nabi Bakhsh Baloch, a renowned linguist of the Sindhi language, has compiled and printed a new edition after 32 years of research into folk culture, language and the history of Sindhi language. Another poet Dr Aurangzeb Siyal has recently launched a book named "Louk Zangeer".

The word "Sur", from Sanskrit word Svara, means a mode of singing. The Surs are sung as Ragas In Indian classical music, its "Ragas" and "Raginis" are sung at different times of day and night. In Risalo the Surs are named according to their subject matter. The underlying theme is how the individual is to cultivate the godly attributes, negate his ego so as to evolve to a better human being.

The traditional 30 Surs included in Shah Jo Risalo are:
 
 Kalyaan
 Yaman Kalyaan
 Khanbhaat
 Suri Raag
 Samundi
 Sohni
 Sassui Aburi
 Maazuri
 Desi
 Kohyari
 Husaini
 Lilan Chanesar
 Momal Rano
 Marui
 Kaamod
 Ghattu
 Sorath
 Kedaro
 Sarang
 Asaa
 Rippa
 Khahori
 Barwo sindhi
 Ramkali
 Kapati
 Purab
 Karayal
 Pirbhati
 Dahar
 Bilawal
 Sur Kamod

These Surs contain Bayts which Shah latif sang in state of ecstasy. These Bayts in the Surs concerning the life-stories of his heroines, viz. Suhni, Sassui, Lila, Mumal, Marui, Nuri and Sorath, are not in chronological sequences, for the Sufi Poet in his state of "Wajd" or ecstasy, was concerned with the moments of denouncements in life-stories, which he used as allegories to express his mystical experiences.

 Shah's Heroines 

The heroines of Shah Abdul Latif Bhittai's poetry are known as the Eight queens of Sindhi folklore who have been given the status of royalty in Shah Jo Risalo. The Eight Queens are celebrated throughout Sindh for their positive qualities: honesty, integrity, piety and loyalty. They are also valued for their bravery and their willingness to risk their lives in the name of love. The Seven Queens mentioned in Shah Jo Risalo are Marui, Momal, Sassui, Noori, Sohni, Sorath, and Lila'''. In his poetry Shah has alluded in elaborate way to these characters of Sindhi folktales and used them as metaphors for high spiritual life.

Perhaps what Shah Abdul Latif Bhittai saw in his tales of these women was an idealized view of womanhood, but the truth remains that the Seven Queens inspired women all over Sindh to have the courage to choose love and freedom over tyranny and oppression. The lines from the Risalo describing their trials are sung at Sufi shrines all over Sindh, and especially at the urs of Shah Abdul Latif every year at Bhit Shah.

These romantic tales of Bhittai are commonly known as Momal Rano, Umar Marui, Sohni Mehar, Lilan Chanesar, Noori Jam Tamachi, Sassui Punnhun and Sorath Rai Diyach or Seven Queens of Shah Abdul Latif Bhittai.Sassui Punnhun and Sohni Mehar aka Sohni Mahiwal in Punjabi are also celebrated in Punjab along with Heer Ranjha and Mirza Sahiban'' and thus form part of Punjabi traditions.

These Ten tragic romances from South Asia (all from present day Pakistan) have become part of the cultural identity of Pakistan.

Translations 
Shah Jo Risalo was first translated into German in 1866 by Ernest Trump, a German scholar and missionary when in 1860s he became fascinated by Sindhi language and culture and the jogis and singers who sang Shah Latif’s verses. With the help of Sindhi scholars he compiled a selection of the original verses and called it "Shah Jo Risalo" (the message of Shah). It was first translated in English by Elsa Kazi, a German lady married to Allama I. I. Kazi, who translated selections of Shah Jo Risalo in English prose. Later in 1940, Dr H.T Sorley, an English scholar learnt Sindhi, and published selections from the Risalo by the Oxford University Press entitled "Shah Abdul latif of Bhit - His Poetry, Life and Times".

The most recent work (1994) of translation of Risalo into English is that of Amena Khamisani, a professor in English Literature at the Sindh University. Shaikh Ayaz, the famous Sindhi poet, translated Risalo into Urdu. Risalo is also translated in Punjabi and more recently French translation was also undertaken by Cultural department of Sindh. Part of Risalo is also translated in Arabic.
There is one more translation of Shah Abdul Latif by name "Seeking The Beloved" translated by Hari Daryani 'Dilgir' a noted Sindhi poet and Anju Makhija. This book was honoured with Sahitya Akademi Award for translation in the year 2012.
Agha Saleem, a renowned name in Sindhi literature, has also translated a number of 'Surs' from Risalo which are published by Sindh Culture Department.

See also 
 Lilan Chanesar
 Bhit

References

External links 
 Shah Jo Risalo — Full text in Sindhi Language
 Bhittaipedia, complete Anthology based on Shah Jo Risalo
 Shah Jo Risalo - The Selection, translated by: Elsa Kazi into English
 Official Fan Page of Shah Jo Risalo at Facebook in various languages
 Shah Jo Risalo Full text in e-book/PDF format
 Shah Jo Risalo: Punjabi Translation of Selected verses

 
Sufi literature
Sindhi folklore
Pakistani literature
Islamic poetry
Devotional literature
Sindhi poetry